The following elections occurred in the year 1855.

Africa  
 1855 Liberian general election

Europe  
 1855 Belgian general election
 1855 Danish Folketing election

North America

Canada
 1855 Newfoundland general election

United States
 1854 and 1855 United States House of Representatives elections
 1854 and 1855 United States Senate elections 
 1855 Alabama gubernatorial election
 1855 California gubernatorial election
 1855 Louisiana gubernatorial election
 1855 New York state election
 1855 Ohio gubernatorial election
 1855 Texas gubernatorial election
 1855 Virginia gubernatorial election 
 1855 Wisconsin gubernatorial election

Oceania 
 1855 New Zealand general election
 1855 South Australian colonial election

See also
 :Category:1855 elections

1855
Elections